Matunga is a former constituency of the Maharashtra Legislative Assembly. It was abolished when the constituency boundaries were re-arranged through 2008 delimitation bill.

Members of Vidhan Sabha

Election Results

1962 Vidhan Sabha Election 
 Liladhar Passu Shah (INC) : 21,258
 M. Madhavan (PSP) : 18707

1972 Election 
 Kamla Raman (INC) : 26,037 votes  
 Narayan Dandekar (Swatantra Party) : 11856

1978 Election 
 Kohli Sohansingh Jodhsingh (Janata Party) : 41, 568 votes
 Bhat Padma Subha  (INC(I))  : 9,956

1990 Election 
  Chandrakanta Goyal (BJP) : 32,355 votes 
  V. Subramnian (INC) : 29,150

1995 Election 
 Goyal, Chandrakanta Vedprakash (BJP) : 46,443 
 Upendra P. Doshi (INC) : 37,613

2004 Election 
 Jagannath Achanna Shetty (INC) : 48,266 
 Babubhai Bhawanji (BJP) : 43,610

References

Former assembly constituencies of Maharashtra